The demographics of Ukraine relate to population growth, population density, ethnicity, education-level, health, economic status, religious affiliations, and other aspects of the population of Ukraine.

The data in this article are based on the 2001 Ukrainian census (the most recent census), the CIA World Factbook, and State Statistics Committee of Ukraine figures. The next census, originally scheduled to take place in 2020,
was re-scheduled in 2020 to take place in 2023.

The State Statistics Service of Ukraine estimated the total population of the country (excluding Crimea) on 1 January 2022 at around 41 million. During the war in Donbas, the Ukrainian government lost control of portions of the Donbas region. Additionally, due to the Russian invasion in 2022, more than 8million Ukrainians fled the country in a refugee crisis.

History 

There were roughly four million Ukrainians at the end of the 17th century.
The majority of the historical information is sourced from Demoscope.ru. The territory of modern Ukraine at the times listed above varied greatly. Western Ukraine, west of the Zbruch river, until 1939 was for most of the time part of the Kingdom of Galicia and later the Polish Republic. Detailed information for those territories is missing, for more information see Demographics of Poland. Crimea changed hands as well; in 1897 it was a part of the Taurida Governorate, but after the October Revolution became part of the Russian SFSR, and in 1954 was brought under the administration of the Ukrainian SSR.

The territory of Budjak (southern Bessarabia) became a part of the Ukrainian SSR in June 1940. The censuses of 1926 through 1989 were taken in the Ukrainian SSR. The census of 1897 is taken from the statistics of nine governorates that were in the territory of today's Ukraine. The statistics of the 1906 records are taken from www.statoids.com which provides a broad degree of historical explanation on the situation in Imperial Russia. The census statistics of 1931 were estimated by Professor Zenon Kuzela. His calculations are as of 1 January 1931. This ethnographer is mentioned in the Encyclopedia of Ukraine as one of the sources only available due to a lack of an official census.

The 2001 census was the first (and so far only) official census of independent Ukraine. The 2003–2009 stats were taken from the official website of UkrStat and represent the data as of February of each year for the population.

Famines and migration 
The famines of the 1930s, followed by the devastation of World War II, created a demographic disaster. Life expectancy at birth fell to a level as low as ten years for females and seven for males in 1933 and plateaued around 25 for females and 15 for males in the period 1941–44. According to The Oxford companion to World War II, "Over 7 million inhabitants of Ukraine, more than one-sixth of the pre-war population, were killed during the Second World War."

Significant migration took place in the first years of Ukrainian independence. More than one million people moved into Ukraine in 1991–92, mostly from the other former Soviet republics. In total, between 1991 and 2004, 2.2 million immigrated to Ukraine (of these, 2 million came from the other former Soviet Union states), and 2.5 million emigrated from Ukraine (of these, 1.9 million moved to other former Soviet Union republics). As of 2015, immigrants constituted an estimated 11.4% of the total population, or 4.8 million people. In 2006, there were an estimated 1.2 million Canadians of Ukrainian ancestry, giving Canada the world's third-largest Ukrainian population behind Ukraine itself and Russia. There are also large Ukrainian diaspora communities in Russia, Poland, the United States, Brazil, Kazakhstan, and Argentina.

Since about 2015, there has been a growing number of Ukrainians working in the European Union, particularly Poland. Eurostat reported that 662,000 Ukrainians received EU residence permits in 2017, with 585,439 being to Poland. In 2019, World Bank statistics show that money remittances back to Ukraine have roughly doubled from 2015 to 2018, and are worth about 4% of GDP. The Ukrainian authorities only records its citizens who apply for foreign citizenship, not those who apply for foreign resideny 

After the start of the Russian invasion of Ukraine (2022–present), eight million people fled during the ensuing 2022–2023 Ukrainian refugee crisis, Europe's biggest refugee crisis since World War II. Most have gone to Central Europe.

Population decline 

According to estimations of the State Statistics Service of Ukraine, the population of Ukraine (excluding Crimea) on 1 May 2021 was 41,442,615.

The country's population has been declining since the 1990s because of a high emigration rate, coupled with high death rates and low birth rates. The population has been shrinking by an average of over 300,000 annually since 1993.

In 2007, the country's rate of population decline was the fourth highest in the world.

Ukraine suffers a high mortality rate from environmental pollution, poor diets, widespread smoking, extensive alcoholism and deteriorating medical care.

During the years 2008 to 2010, more than 1.5 million children were born in Ukraine, compared to fewer than 1.2 million during 1999–2001. In 2008 Ukraine posted record-breaking birth rates since its 1991 independence. Infant mortality rates have also dropped from 10.4 deaths to 8.3 per 1,000 children under one year of age. This is lower than in 153 countries of the world.

In 2019 the government ran an electronic census using multiple sources, including mobile phone and pension data, and estimated that Ukraine's population, excluding Crimea and parts of the Donbas, to be 37.3 million. About 20 million were of active working age.

Fertility and natalist policies 

The current birth rate in Ukraine, is 8.1 live births/1,000 population, and the death rate is 14.7 deaths/1,000 population.

The phenomenon of lowest-low fertility, defined as total fertility below 1.3, is emerging throughout Europe and is attributed by many to postponement of the initiation of childbearing. Ukraine, where total fertility (a very low 1.1 in 2001), was one of the world's lowest, shows that there is more than one pathway to lowest-low fertility. Although Ukraine has undergone immense political and economic transformations during 1991–2004, it has maintained a young age at first birth and nearly universal childbearing. Analysis of official national statistics and the Ukrainian Reproductive Health Survey show that fertility declined to very low levels without a transition to a later pattern of childbearing. Findings from focus group interviews suggest explanations of the early fertility pattern. These findings include the persistence of traditional norms for childbearing and the roles of men and women, concerns about medical complications and infertility at a later age, and the link between early fertility and early marriage. Ukraine subsequently has one of the oldest populations in the world, with the average age of 40.8 years.

To help mitigate the declining population, the government continues to increase child support payments. Thus it provides one-time payments of 12,250 hryvnias for the first child, 25,000 hryvnias for the second and 50,000 hryvnias for the third and fourth, along with monthly payments of 154 hryvnias per child. The demographic trend is showing signs of improvement, as the birth rate has been steadily growing since 2001. Net population growth over the first nine months of 2007 was registered in five provinces of the country (out of 24), and population shrinkage was showing signs of stabilising nationwide. In 2007 the highest birth rates were in the western oblasts. In 2008, Ukraine emerged from lowest-low fertility, and the upward trend has continued to 2012, while the population was still decreasing but at a pace that was slowing year to year. If early 2010s trends were continuing, the population of Ukraine could have returned to positive growth later in the same decade. Similar trends were seen in Russia and Belarus as well, which experienced population growth in the 2010s. In 2014 the strong decline in births was re-established, with 2018 having fewer than half the number of births as in 1989. (see demographic tables) In 2020 the number of births decreased to 293,000, reaching levels not seen even in the late 90s and early 2000s when the number of births started to increase.

According to the 2021 interview with Ukrainian professor Iryna Kurylo from M.V. Ptukha Institute for Demography and Social Studies, Ukraine's total fertility rate is 1.20 children per woman making it the lowest in Europe.

Population

Life expectancy 

 total population: 71.37  years
 male: 66.34  years
 female: 76.22  years (2013 official)

Average life expectancy at age 0 of the total population.

Total fertility rate

6.00  children born/woman (1913 est.)
5.39  children born/woman (1925 est.)
1.08  children born/woman (2001)
1.46  children born/woman (2011)
1.53  children born/woman (2012)
1.21  children born/woman (2018)

In 2001 Ukraine recorded the lowest fertility rate ever recorded in Europe for an independent country: 1.08 child/woman. During this year the number of children born was less than half of that born in 1987 and less than a quarter of that born in 1937. Lower rates were recorded only in former East Germany, which registered 0.77 child/woman in 1994, as well as Taiwan (from 2008 to 2010), South Korea in 2018 and both Hong Kong and Macau (from about 2000 to 2010). After neglect by the Kuchma administration, both the Yushchenko and the Yanukovych governments have made increasing the birth rate a priority.

Vital statistics
Notable events in Ukraine demography:
 1932-33 – South Soviet Famine in Ukrainian Soviet Socialist Republic
 1939 – Addition of western regions to Ukraine with the End of the Second Polish Republic due to German–Soviet invasion of Poland at the beginning of Second World War
 1991 – Independence from the USSR
 2014 – Annexation of Crimea by the Russian Federation
 2022 – Russian invasion of Ukraine

Ukrainian provinces of the Russian Empire

The figures below refer to the nine governorates of the Russian Empire (Volhynia, Katerynoslav, Kyiv, Podilia, Poltava, Tauryda, Kharkiv, Kherson and Chernihiv) with a Ukrainian majority.

Between WWI and WWII

(a) Information is given for Ukraine's territory within its old boundaries up to 17 September 1939
(b) Information is given for Ukraine's territory within its present-day boundaries, after the Soviet annexation of Eastern Galicia and Volhynia in September 1939

After WWII

Source: State Statistics Service of Ukraine

Note: Data excludes Crimea starting in 2014.

Current vital statistics

Note: Russia occupied and later annexed the Crimean Peninsula in 2014. The annexation is internationally recognized only by a small number of nations. The Ukrainian statistics Service can no longer provide accurate data on Crimea in the post-2014 period. Therefore, starting from 2014, the territories of the Autonomous Republic of Crimea and the city of Sevastopol are not included in the Demographics of Ukraine, but instead are included to the Demographics of Russia.
All data from State Statistics Service of Ukraine.

Regional data

Population by oblast

Birth data by oblast
Note: Recent data for Donetsk and Luhansk Oblasts has been affected by the war in Donbas, and may only include births within the government-held parts of the oblasts.

Year in review 2013
Compared to 2012, amount of attrition increased by 16,278 persons, or 3.1 to 3.5 persons per 1,000 inhabitants real. Natural decrease was observed in 23 oblasts of the country, while natural increases were recorded only in the capital Kyiv, Zakarpattya, Rivne and Volyn oblast (respectively 5,302, 3,689, 2,889 and 1,034 people).

Some regions registered a low natural decline, such as Chernivtsi, Ivano-Frankivsk, Sevastopol, Lviv, Ternopil, Crimea, Kherson and Odesa (respectively, −55, −642, −863, −2,124, −2,875, −2,974, −3,748 and −4,448 people). The largest declines were recorded in Donetsk, Luhansk, Dnipro, Kharkiv, Poltava and Chernihiv (respectively −28,311, −15,291, −15,007, −12,765, −10,062 and −10,057), regions which have in common a low birth rate and high mortality of a large urban population and a strong rural population aging.

Net migration rate
-5.4 migrant(s)/1,000 population (2015).

Infant mortality rate
9.1  deaths/1,000 infants live births for 4,564 deaths. (2010)
9.0  deaths/1,000 infants live births for 4,511 deaths. (2011)
8.4  deaths/1,000 infants live births for 4,371 deaths. (2012)
8.0  deaths/1,000 infants live births for 4,030 deaths. (2013)
8.9  deaths/1,000 infants live births for 2,193 death for January–June 2011
8.6  deaths/1,000 infants live births for 2,190 death for January–June 2012
7.8  deaths/1,000 infants live births for 1,993 deaths for January–June 2013

Total fertility rate by oblast

Although none of the oblasts in 2013 has recorded a higher fertility rate 2.10 children per woman. However, the rate has been in rural areas in the Rivne Oblast (2.50) and the Volyn Oblast (2.20). While a very close generational renewal rate was achieved in the Odesa Oblast (2.04), Zakarpattia Oblast (2.00), Mykolaiv Oblast (1.95), Chernivtsi Oblast (1.93) and Zhytomyr Oblast (1.91) weaker when they have been recorded in the Luhansk oblast (1.41), Sumy oblast (1.47) and Cherkasy Oblast (1.53).

The fertility rate of the highest urban areas were recorded in the Zakarpattia Oblast (1.80), the city of Sevastopol (1.57), Volyn Oblast (1.56), Kyiv Oblast (1.56) and the Rivne Oblast (1.54). The lowest rates were recorded in the Sumy Oblast (1.23), Kharkiv Oblast (1.26), Cherkasy Oblast (1.28), Chernihiv Oblast (1.28), Chernivtsi Oblast (1.28), Luhansk oblast (1.28), Poltava oblast (1.29), Donetsk oblast (1.29) and Zaporizhzhia Oblast (1.32).

Other demographics statistics

Demographic statistics according to the World Population Review in 2019.

One birth every 1 minutes
One death every 48 seconds
Net loss of one person every 2 minutes
One net migrant every 30 minutes

Demographic statistics according to the CIA World Factbook, unless otherwise indicated.

Population
43,952,299 (July 2018 est.)
44,033,874 (July 2017 est.)
 45,426,249 (1 January 2013)

Age structure
0-14 years: 15.95% (male 3,609,386 /female 3,400,349)
15-24 years: 9.57% (male 2,156,338 /female 2,047,821)
25-54 years: 44.03% (male 9,522,108 /female 9,831,924)
55-64 years: 13.96% (male 2,638,173 /female 3,499,718)
65 years and over: 16.49% (male 2,433,718 /female 4,812,764) (2018 est.)

0-14 years: 15.76% (male 3,571,358/female 3,366,380)
15-24 years: 9.86% (male 2,226,142/female 2,114,853)
25-54 years: 44.29% (male 9,579,149/female 9,921,387)
55-64 years: 13.8% (male 2,605,849/female 3,469,246)
65 years and over: 16.3% (male 2,409,049/female 4,770,461) (2017 est.)

0–14 years: 15.1% = 6,449,171 (2015 official.)
15–64 years: 69.3% = 29,634,710
65 years and over: 15.6% = 6,675,780

0–14 years: 14.8% = 6,989,802
15–64 years: 69.2% = 32,603,475
65 years and over: 16.0% = 7,507,185 (2005 official.)

0–14 years: 21.6% = 11,101,469
15–64 years: 66.7% = 34,320,742
65 years and over: 11.7% = 6,022,934 (1989 official.)

Median age
total: 40.8 years. Country comparison to the world: 47th
male: 37.7 years
female: 43.9 years (2018 est.)

total: 40.6 years
male: 37.4 years
female: 43.7 years (2017 est.)

total: 39.8 years
male: 39.7 years
female: 40.1 years (2014 official)
total: 39.7 years
male: 39.5 years
female: 40.1 years (2013 official)
total: 34.8 years
male: 31.9 years
female: 37.7 years (1989 official)

Birth rate
10.1 births/1,000 population (2018 est.) Country comparison to the world: 190th
10.3 births/1,000 population (2017 est.)

Death rate
14.3 deaths/1,000 population (2018 est.) Country comparison to the world: 6th
14.4 deaths/1,000 population (2017 est.)

Total fertility rate
1.55 children born/woman (2018 est.) Country comparison to the world: 190th
1.54 children born/woman (2017 est.)

Net migration rate
4.6 migrant(s)/1,000 population (2018 est.) Country comparison to the world: 29th
0 migrant(s)/1,000 population (2017 est.)

Mother's mean age at first birth
24.9 years (2014 est.)

Population growth rate
0.04% (2018 est.) Country comparison to the world: 187th
-0.41% (2017 est.)

Life expectancy at birth
total population: 72.4 years. Country comparison to the world: 148th
male: 67.7 years
female: 77.4 years (2018 est.)

Ethnic groups
Ukrainian 77.8%, Russian 17.3%, Belarusian 0.6%, Moldovan 0.5%, Crimean Tatar 0.5%, Bulgarian 0.4%, Hungarian 0.3%, Romanian 0.3%, Polish 0.3%, Jewish 0.2%, other 1.8% (2001 est.)

Languages
Ukrainian (official) 67.5%, Russian (regional language) 29.6%, other (includes small Crimean Tatar-, Moldovan/Romanian-, and Hungarian-speaking minorities) 2.9% (2001 est.)
Note: in February 2018, the Constitutional Court ruled that 2012 language legislation entitling a language spoken by at least 10% of an oblast's population to be given the status of "regional language" – allowing for its use in courts, schools, and other government institutions – was unconstitutional, thus making the law invalid; Ukrainian remains the country's only official nationwide

Religions
Orthodox (includes Ukrainian Autocephalous Orthodox (UAOC), Ukrainian Orthodox – Kyiv Patriarchate (UOC-KP), Ukrainian Orthodox – Moscow Patriarchate (UOC-MP)), Ukrainian Greek Catholic, Roman Catholic, Protestant, Muslim, Jewish
Note: Ukraine's population is overwhelmingly Christian; the vast majority – up to two-thirds – identify themselves as Orthodox, but many do not specify a particular branch; the UOC-KP and the UOC-MP each represent less than a quarter of the country's population, the Ukrainian Greek Catholic Church accounts for 8–10%, and the UAOC accounts for 1–2%; Muslim and Jewish adherents each compose less than 1% of the total population (2013 est.)

Dependency ratios
total dependency ratio: 44.8 (2015 est.)
youth dependency ratio: 21.8 (2015 est.)
elderly dependency ratio: 23 (2015 est.)
potential support ratio: 4.3 (2015 est.)
note: data include Crimea

Urbanization
urban population: 69.4% of total population (2018)
rate of urbanization: -0.33% annual rate of change (2015–20 est.)

Literacy
definition: age 15 and over can read and write (2015 est.)
total population: 99.8%
male: 99.8%
female: 99.7% (2015 est.)

School life expectancy (primary to tertiary education)
total: 15 years
male: 15 years
female: 16 years (2014)

Unemployment, youth ages 15–24
total: 23%. Country comparison to the world: 53rd
male: 24%
female: 21.5% (2016 est.)

Statistic rate of regional capitals

Ethnic groups

In 2001, the ethnic composition was: Ukrainians 77.8%, Russian 17.3%, Romanian 1.1% (including Moldovan 0.8%), Belarusian 0.6%, Crimean Tatar 0.5%, Bulgarian 0.4%, Hungarian 0.3%, Polish 0.3%, Jewish 1.0%, Pontic Greeks 0.2% and other 1.6% (including Muslim Bulgarians, otherwise known as Torbesh and a microcosm of Swedes of Gammalsvenskby). It is also estimated that there are about 49,817 ethnic Koreans (0.12%) in Ukraine that belong to the Koryo-saram group. Their number may be as high as 100,000 as many ethnic Koreans were assimilated into the majority population. Rusyns are also not recognised by the Ukrainian government as a distinct ethnic group and are instead treated as a sub-group of Ukrainians.

Before World War II

After World War II

Languages

According to the 2001 census, the following languages are common in Ukraine: Ukrainian 67.5%, Russian 29.6%, Crimean Tatar, Urum (Turkic Greeks), Bulgarian, Moldovan/Romanian, Polish, Hungarian.
The below table gives the total population of various ethnic groups in Ukraine and the primary language, according to the 2001 census.

Religion

A 2018 survey conducted by the Razumkov Centre found that 71.7% of the population declared themselves believers in any religion, while 4.7% declared themselves non-believers, and 3.0% declared to be atheists. Of the total Ukrainian population, 87.4% declared to be Christians, comprising a 67.3% who declared to be Orthodox, 10.2% Catholic (split into 9.4% Greek Rite Catholics and 0.8% Latin Rite Catholics), 7.7% simply Christians, and 2.2% Protestants. Judaism comprises 0.4% of the population. In earlier surveys around 1-2% of the population stated that they adhere to Islam.

According to data from 2018 among those Ukrainians who declared to believe in Orthodoxy, 28.7% declared to be members of the Ukrainian Orthodox Church of the Kyivan Patriarchate (being incorporated as of the 5 January 2019 into the Orthodox Church of Ukraine), while 12.8% declared to be members of the Ukrainian Orthodox Church of the Moscovian Patriarchate (which is an autonomous Orthodox church under the Russian Orthodox Church). A further 0.3% were members of the Ukrainian Autocephalous Orthodox Church, which, like the Kyivan Patriarchate, where incorporated in 2019 into the Orthodox Church of Ukraine. Among the remaining Orthodox Ukrainians, 23.4% declared to be "simply Orthodox", without affiliation to any patriarchate, while a further 1.9% declared that they "did not know" which patriarchate or Orthodox church they belonged to.

Regional differences

Regional differences in population change

Between the Soviet census of 1989 and the Ukrainian census of 2001, Ukraine's population declined from 51,706,600 to 48,457,020, a loss of 2,926,700 people or 5.7% of the 1989 population. However, this trend has been quite uneven and varied regionally.  Two regions in western Ukraine — Rivne and Zakarpattia, saw slight population increases of 0.3% and 0.5% respectively. A third western Ukrainian region, Volyn, lost less than 0.1% of its population between 1989 and 2001. Collectively, between 1989 and 2001 the seven westernmost regions of Ukraine lost 167,500 people or 1.7% of their 1989 population.  The total population of these regions in 2001 was 9,593,800.

Between 1989 and 2001, the population of Kyiv City increased by 0.3% due to positive net-migration. Outside the capital, the central, southern and eastern regions experienced a severe decline in population. Between 1989 and 2001, the Donetsk region lost 491,300 people or 9.2% of its 1989 population, and neighbouring Luhansk region lost 11% of its population. Chernihiv region, in central Ukraine northeast of Kyiv, lost 170,600 people or 12% of its 1989 population, the highest percentage loss in of any region in Ukraine. In southern Ukraine, Odesa region lost 173,600 people, or 6.6% of its 1989 population. By 2001, Crimea's population declined by 29,900 people, representing only 1.4% loss of the 1989 population.

However, this was due to the influx of approximately 200,000 Crimean Tatars – a number equivalent to approximately 10% of Crimea's 1989 population – who arrived in Crimea after 1989 and whose population in that region increased by a factor of 6.4 from 38,000 to 243,400 between 1989 and 2001. Collectively, the net population loss in the regions of Ukraine outside the westernmost regions was 2,759,200 people or 6.6% of the 1989 population. The total population of these regions in 2001 was 39,186,100.

Thus, from 1989–2001 the pattern of population change was one of slight growth in Kyiv, slight declines in western Ukraine, large declines in eastern, central and southern Ukraine and a relatively small decline in Crimea due to a large influx of Crimean Tatars.

Regional differences in birth and fertility rates

Ukraine's total fertility rate is one of the lowest in Europe. However, significant regional differences in birth rates may account for some of the demographic differences. In the third quarter of 2007, for instance, the highest birth rate among Ukrainian regions occurred in Volyn Oblast, with a birth rate of 13.4/1,000 people, compared to the Ukrainian country-wide average of 9.6/1,000 people. Volyn's birthrate is higher than the average birth rate of any European country with the exceptions of Iceland and Albania.

In 2007, for the first time since 1990, five Ukrainian regions (Zakarpattia Oblast, Rivne Oblast, Volyn Oblast, Lviv Oblast, and Kyiv Oblast) experienced more births than deaths. This demonstrates a positive trend of increasing birthrates in the last couple of years throughout Ukraine. The ratio of births to deaths in those regions in 2007 was 119%, 117%, 110%, 100.7%, and 108%, respectively.

With the exception of Kyiv region, all of the regions with more births than deaths were in the less industrially developed regions of western Ukraine. According to a spokesperson for Ukraine's Ministry of Justice, the overall ratio of births to deaths in Ukraine had improved from 1 to 1.7 in 2004–2005 to 1 to 1.4 in 2008.  However, the worst birth to death ratios in the country were in the eastern and central oblasts of Donetsk, Luhansk, Cherkasy and Poltava. In these regions, for every birth there were 2.1 deaths.

Notably, western Ukraine never experienced the Holodomor, as Poland, Czechoslovakia, and Romania ruled it at the time, helping to explain the better demographics there, as the rural population was never devastated. Specifically, during the time of the Holodomor, Poland ruled Ivano-Frankivsk, Lviv, Rivne, Ternopil, and Volyn Oblasts, whereas Zakarpattia Oblast was under Czechoslovak rule, and Romania controlled Chernivtsi Oblast and the Budjak section of Odesa Oblast.

Abortion behavior in the North, South, East and Center regions of Ukraine are relatively homogeneous while the Western region differs greatly. Overall, the abortion rate in western Ukraine is three times lower than in other regions; however this is not due to an increased use of modern contraceptive methods in the West, but simply due to the fact that pregnant women in the Western regions are more likely to keep their babies. Donetsk and Dniproptrovsk oblasts in eastern and central Ukraine have the country's highest rate of abortions.

Regional differences and death rates and health

Death rates also vary widely by region; Eastern and southern Ukraine have the highest death rates in the country, and the life expectancy for children born in Chernihiv, Dnipropetrovsk, Donetsk, Kherson, Kropyvnytskyi, Luhansk, Mikolaiv, and Odesa regions is 1.5 years lower than the national average.

Ukraine had a suicide rate of 16.5 per 100,000 population in 2017, a significant decrease from the suicide rate of 29.6 per 100,000 in 1998. Suicides are more frequent in the central part of the country (the highest suicide rates was in Kirovohrad Oblast; In western Ukraine, the suicide rate was lower than the national average. Lviv Oblast has the lowest suicide rate – 5.3

The Southern and eastern Ukrainian regions also suffer from the highest rates of HIV and AIDS, which impacts life expectancy. In late 2000, 60% of all AIDS cases in Ukraine were concentrated in the Odesa, Dnipropetrovsk, and Donetsk regions. A major reason for this is the fact that the urbanized and industrialized regions in the East and South of Ukraine suffered most from the economic crisis in the 1990s, which in turn led to the spread of unemployment, alcoholism, and drug abuse, thus setting the conditions for wider spread of the epidemic.

Regional differences in income

The western and central regions of Ukraine had lower GDP per capita than Kyiv and the industrialized eastern regions of Ukraine. In December 2019 the average monthly salary in Ukraine was 12,264 hryvnias (or 519 US dollars). Chernihiv oblast (northern Ukraine) and Kirovohrad Oblast (central Ukraine), had the lowest monthly salary of 8,851 and 9,450 hryvnias, respectively. In contrast, the monthly wage in the city of Kyiv was 18,869 hryvnias per month, and in Kyiv oblast – 13,259 per month. In 2013, outside of the capital city of Kyiv, the wealthiest region was Donetsk Oblast with annual income 31,048 hryvnias. But as of 2017, Donetsk Oblast ranks as the second poorest after Luhansk Oblast with annual incomes 25,278 hryvnias and 16,416 hryvnias respectively. Both are in the eastern Ukraine and have sustained direct losses as a consequence of military actions.

Ukraine recorded one of the sharpest declines in poverty of any transition economy in 2001–2016 years. The poverty rate, measured against an absolute poverty line (below $1.25 per day in dollars, based on World Bank) fell from a high of 32 percent in 2001 to 8 percent in 2005. In terms of poverty rates, the central and northern regions have the country's highest poverty rates – 10.0%. The western and southern regions – 9.1% and 9% respectively. Kyiv City had the lowest poverty rate – 1.4%.
Percent of population living under $5.50 a day was 19% in 2005 and dropped to 4.0 percent in 2018.

Urbanization

Migration

Emigration
Ukraine is the major source of migrants in many of the member states of the European Union. During the 1990s and early 2000s, Ukraine's sputtering economy and political instability contributed to rising emigration, especially to nearby Poland and Hungary, but also to other countries like Italy, Portugal, Spain, Israel and Canada. Although estimates vary, approximately two to three million Ukrainian citizens are currently working abroad, in construction, service, housekeeping, and agriculture industries.

Between 1991 and 2004, the government counted 2,537,400 individuals who emigrated; 1,897,500 moved to other post-Soviet states, and 639,900 moved to other, mainly Western, states.

By the early 2000s, Ukrainian embassies reported that 300,000 Ukrainian citizens were working in Poland, 200,000 in Italy, approximately 200,000 in the Czech Republic, 150,000 in Portugal, 100,000 in Spain, 35,000 in Turkey, 20,000 in the United States and small significant numbers in Austria, Belgium, France, Germany, Greece, Sweden, Switzerland and the UK. The largest number of Ukrainian workers abroad, about one million, are in the Russian Federation. Since 1992, 232,072 persons born in Ukraine have emigrated to the US.

From the point of view of the economic impact on natives, more appropriate than the absolute numbers is the volume of immigration as a proportion of the native population. Italy has the highest rate of Ukrainian emigrants as a proportion of the native population, while the much larger Russia has the largest absolute confirmed number of Ukrainian emigrants (leaving aside Poland, Portugal and the Czech Republic, for which there is conflicting data).

Immigration
Between 1991 and 2003, about 100,000 illegal immigrants were detained at the western borders. In 2005, about 5,000 illegal immigrants are detained yearly. Most of these are Asian immigrants from China, India, Pakistan and Afghanistan. At the time about 3,000 officially registered refugees resided in Ukraine, of whom most were Afghans.

Ukraine accepted some 62,000 refugees from Transnistria following its war in 1992. Thousands were also accepted during decade from other post-Soviet conflicts in Abkhazia, Chechnya and Tajikistan.

Results between the 1989 Soviet census and the 2001 census showed an increased number of CIS people in Ukraine from regions witnessing war. The number of Armenians in Ukraine almost doubled to 99,900 people during this period, while the number of Georgians and Azerbaijanis also had substantial increases.

As of April 2020, 1.4 million Ukrainians are internally displaced due to the ongoing war in Donbas.

See also
 Health in Ukraine
 Demographic history of Crimea
 Ethnic groups in Ukraine

General:
 Ageing of Europe

References

External links

Trafficking in and enslavement of women Follow-up to the Fourth World Conference on Women, 2–13 March 1998
Migration News, 2001 University of California, Davis
The demographic situation in Ukraine: present state. tendencies, and predictions , Razumkov Centre
On the status of observance and protection of the rights of Ukrainian citizens abroad the Special Report of the Ukrainian Parliament Commissioner for Human Rights
News on Trafficking of Ukrainian Women, 2000–01 Trafficking in Women from Ukraine Research Project, University of Rhode Island
Caught Between East and West, Ukraine Struggles with Its Migration Policy By Olena Malynovska, National Institute for International Security Problems, Kyiv, January 2006
Emigration from Ukraine, 23 October 2003 The Economist (subscription required)
 
 
 Mortality and Causes of Death in 20th-Century Ukraine MPIDR - Publications